Georg Fleps (born 19 June 1922) was a Romanian-born Sturmmann and assistant gunner to Hans Siptrott, serving in the Waffen-SS under Joachim Peiper. He was found guilty of War Crimes in the Malmedy Massacre during the Battle of the Bulge and sentenced to death in 1946. The sentence was commuted to 20 years on appeal.

Georg Fleps was born in Romania on 19 June 1922. He was interviewed and appears in archival footage in a documentary, Über Galgen wächst kein Gras (No grass grows over the gallows), released in 2005. (ab Minute 35:44). Fleps is the defendant Nr. 14.

References 
 Danny S. Parker: Fatal Crossroads: The untold story of the Malmedy massacre at the battle of the bulge. Da Capo Press, New York, 2012, S. 149–151
 Paul Milata: Zwischen Hitler, Stalin und Antonescu: Rumäniendeutsche in der Waffen-SS, Böhlau Verlag, Weimar, Berlin, Wien, 2009, S. 261

External links 
 The Malmédy Massacre Trial, Jewish Virtual Library
 65 Years Later: The Malmedy Massacre, December 17, 1944, History News Network
 Über Galgen wächst kein Gras - US Folterjustiz , YouTube

1922 births
Possibly living people
Danube-Swabian people
Romanian people imprisoned abroad
Romanian people convicted of war crimes
Romanian prisoners sentenced to death
People convicted in the Malmedy massacre trial
Prisoners sentenced to death by the United States military
Romanian Waffen-SS personnel